Bill Loëb is an American gun writer who writes for Gun Digest and Shooting Illustrated. Formerly, he was a talk show host of a program called One on One on KWNX.

Biography 
Bill was born in New Orleans, Louisiana to a family which was involved in banking and bonds. Their projects included the Lake Pontchartrain Causeway.

Loëb received his education from University of New Orleans and Louisiana State University. He started his career in the wine industry in which he worked for twenty years. Starting in retail, then wholesaling and importing business. Loëb continues to write wine articles and restaurant reviews.

Wanting to spend more time with his daughter, Briana Loëb, he became a realtor in the Austin, Texas market. He quickly became one of the top realtors in the market, working with builders and investors. Now, Baymoon Properties takes clients on a referral basis.

His gun expertise caused him to be approached by Gun Digest to write the book, The Custom 1911. as well as countless articles.

Bill cohosted a radio talk show called One on One on KWNX in Austin, Texas 

Loëb is a women's self-defense instructor with the RAD Systems Program as well as radKIDS.  As another way of giving back, Loëb helps fight property taxes. One year he helped homeowners reduce their assessments by over 6 million dollars as reported by the Hays Free Press in the article Slaying the Tax Dragon. In may of 2022 he exposed the Hays County Central Appraisal District's illegal practice of using protected real estate data to value properties which sparked an investigation by KXAN, entitled Did Hays Central Appraisal District get unauthorized access to private real estate data?

Personal 
Loëb is fond of saying, "While my focus is to personal empowerment, no matter what inspires you, give it away freely.".

Loëb and his wife and stepson live in Dripping Springs, Texas.

Bibliography 
 Loeb, Bill. The Custom 1911
Chip McCormick Passes Away
Early 1911 Customization
Reloading the .300 WinMag
CMC Railed Power Mag

References

Gun writers
American talk radio hosts
American real estate brokers
University of New Orleans alumni
Louisiana State University alumni
People from New Orleans
Living people
Year of birth missing (living people)